Italy for the Italians was a coalition of far-right neo-fascist political parties in Italy. It was founded to participate in the 2018 general election by the neo-fascist, New Force and Tricolor Flame parties.

Composition

Electoral results

Italian Parliament

References

2017 establishments in Italy
2018 disestablishments in Italy
Defunct nationalist parties in Italy
Defunct political party alliances in Italy
Neo-fascist organisations in Italy